Where is Marta? is a 2021 Spanish true crime documentary miniseries about the murder of Marta del Castillo.

Episodes

References

External links
 
 

2021 Spanish television series debuts
Spanish documentary television series
Spanish-language Netflix original programming
True crime television series